Baltan (also Romanized as Bāltān) is a village in Alan Rural District, in the Central District of Sardasht County, West Azerbaijan Province, Iran. At the 2006 census, its population was 33, in seven families.

See also

References 

Populated places in Sardasht County